Amobé Mévégué (1 October 1968 – 8 September 2021) was a Cameroonian journalist, radio host, and producer.

Biography
Born in Yaoundé in 1968, Mévégué arrived in France at the age of five. He earned his Diplôme d'études universitaires générales in communications and also studied cinematography.

In the mid-1980s, Mévégué took part in the foundation of Tabala FM, the first African radio station established in France. In 1994, he became director of Plein Sud, a program broadcast to over 45 million listeners on Radio France Internationale. In 1998, he co-produced the first African talk show on diversity on MCM Africa alongside . That same year, he produced the documentary Abidjan on dit quoi on Canal+ alongside Ivorian journalist .

In 2000, Mévégué co-founded the magazine Afrobiz, as well as the corresponding website Afrobiz.com, which had a circulation of 50,000 copies. From 2002 to 2005, he produced the radio show  on TV5Monde, which featured some prominent names in international music. In 2010, he began running the music and culture section of France 24. In 2014, he became director of the monthly magazine Africanités alongside  and Christian Eboulé.

During the COVID-19 pandemic, Mévégué held the online event "WAN Show 2.0", which featured over 200 personalities. It was held in 2020 and 2021 on Africa Day. While serving as media director of Afrobiz, he founded the television channel Ubiznews.

Amobé Mévégué died of malaria in Paris on 8 September 2021, at the age of 52.

Filmography

Director
Nola Darling (1992)
Tenue correcte exigée (1994)

Producer
Abidjan on dit quoi (1998)

Actor
 (2014)

References

1968 births
2021 deaths
Cameroonian journalists
People from Yaoundé
Deaths in France
Deaths from malaria